Major-General Lionel Frank Page,  (December 17, 1884 – April 26, 1944) was a Canadian Army officer who served in both world wars.

Biography 
Page was born in Yorkshire and was educated at Berkhamsted School. After failing the entrance examinations for Sandhurst, he came to Canada in 1903 to work on Berkhamsted Farm in Red Deer, Alberta, which trained Berkhamsted graduates to homestead on the Prairies. After a year, he acquired land in Red Deer and became a rancher, selling his ranch in 1912 to enter business.

On the outbreak of the First World War, Page volunteered for overseas service and was part of the first contingent of the Canadian Expeditionary Force. He was appointed DSO and received two bars.

During World War II he served as the first General Officer Commanding (GOC) of the 4th Canadian Infantry Division, a post he held from June 1941 until December that year. At the time of his death in April 1944, which was caused by a sudden illness while still in Canada, he was General Officer Commanding-in-Chief, Atlantic Command.

His daughter was the artist P. K. Page.

References 
 https://www.saskatoonlightinfantry.org/major-general-lionel-frank-page-cb-dso.html
 https://generals.dk/general/Page/Lionel_Frank/Canada.html

1884 births
1944 deaths
English emigrants to Canada
Canadian Companions of the Order of the Bath
Canadian Companions of the Distinguished Service Order
Canadian Militia officers
Canadian Expeditionary Force officers
Lord Strathcona's Horse officers
Canadian Army officers
Canadian military personnel of World War I
Canadian Army generals of World War II
Commanders of the Legion of Merit
Canadian generals
People educated at Berkhamsted School
Military personnel from Yorkshire